The Menagerie Wilderness is a designated wilderness area located near Mount Washington in the central Cascade Range of Oregon. It is situated near Highway 20 within the Willamette National Forest and is managed by the US Forest Service.

Geography 
The Menagerie Wilderness is situated around a series of rock pinnacles each uniquely named from the imagination of past climbers; hence the name, Menagerie. The best known, and most popular, is Rooster Rock. Others include Hen Rock, Turkey Monster, and Chicken Rock.

Recreation

The primary recreational activities in Menagerie Wilderness are hiking and rock climbing, but camping and wildlife watching are popular among some visitors. There are only a few established trails in the Menagerie, most notably Trout Creek Trail and Rooster Rock Trail – both of which lead to Rooster Rock. Visiting other pinnacles requires a cross-country hike over steep, rugged terrain.

Vegetation
Vegetation in Menagerie Wilderness is primarily second-growth Douglas-fir, western hemlock, and western red cedar. Much of the understory consists of vine maple, salal, and sword fern.

See also
 List of Oregon Wildernesses
 List of U.S. Wilderness Areas
 Wilderness Act

References

External links
 Willamette National Forest - Menagerie Wilderness

Cascade Range
IUCN Category Ib
Protected areas of Linn County, Oregon
Old-growth forests
Wilderness areas of Oregon
Willamette National Forest
1984 establishments in Oregon
Protected areas established in 1984